In fluid dynamics, Prandtl–Batchelor theorem states that if in a two-dimensional laminar flow at high Reynolds number closed streamlines occur, then the vorticity in the closed streamline region must be a constant. A similar statement holds true for axisymmetric flows. The theorem is named after Ludwig Prandtl and George Batchelor. Prandtl in his celebrated 1904 paper stated this theorem in arguments, George Batchelor unaware of this work proved the theorem in 1956. The problem was also studied in the same year by Richard Feynman and Paco Lagerstrom and by W.W. Wood in 1957.

Mathematical proof
At high Reynolds numbers, Euler equations reduce to solving a problem for stream function,

As it stands, the problem is ill-posed since the vorticity distribution  can have infinite number of possibilities, all of which satisfies the equation and the boundary condition. This is not true if the streamlines are not closed, in which case, every streamline can be traced back to infinity, where  is assumed to be prescribed. The difficulty arises only when closed streamlines occur inside the flow at high Reynolds number, where  is not uniquely defined. The theorem asserts that  is uniquely defined in such cases by examining the limiting process  properly.

In two-dimensional flows, the only non-zero component lies in the z direction. The steady, non-dimensional vorticity equation in this case reduces to

Integrate the equation over a surface  lying entirely in the region where we have closed streamlines, bounded by a closed contour 

The integrand in the left-hand side term can be written as  since . By divergence theorem, one obtains

where  is the outward unit vector normal to the contour line element . The left-hand side integrand can be made zero if the contour  is taken to be one of the closed streamlines since then the velocity vector projected normal to the contour will be zero, that is to say . Thus one obtains

This expression is true for finite but large Reynolds number since we did not neglect the viscous term before. 

But for large but finite , we can write , and this small corrections become smaller and smaller as we increase the Reynolds number. Thus, in the limit , in the first approximation (neglecting the small corrections), we have

Since  is constant for a given streamline, we can take that term outside the integral,

One may notice that the integral is negative of the circulation since

Thus, we have

The circulation around those closed streamlines is not zero (unless the velocity at each point of the streamline is zero with a possible discontinuous vorticity jump across the streamline) . The only way the above equation can be satisfied is only if

i.e., vorticity is not changing across these closed streamlines, thus proving the theorem. Of course, the theorem is not valid inside the boundary layer regime. This theorem cannot be derived from the Euler equations.

References

Fluid dynamics